Tonto+ is a 2007 EP by Battles. It consists of a CD and a DVD. The CD contains the title track, remixes, and live performances, and the DVD has videos for the title track and "Atlas", another song off Battles' debut album Mirrored.

The cover resembles Section 25's From the Hip.

Track listing

Release history

|Spain
|
|{Tonto+++(Ilia)}

References

External links
 

2007 EPs
Battles (band) EPs
Warp (record label) EPs